Oxicesta is a genus of moths of the family Noctuidae.

Species
 Oxicesta geographica Fabricius, 1787
 Oxicesta nervosa Villers, 1789
 Oxicesta serratae Zerny, 1927

References
 Natural History Museum Lepidoptera genus database
 Oxicesta at funet.fi

Hadeninae